Design A-150, popularly known as the Super Yamato class, was a planned class of battleships for the Imperial Japanese Navy. In keeping with longstanding Japanese naval strategy, the A-150s would have carried six  guns to ensure their qualitative superiority over any other battleship they might face. These would have been the largest guns ever carried aboard a capital ship.

Design work on the A-150s began after the preceding  in 1938–1939 and was mostly finished by early 1941, when the Japanese began focusing on aircraft carriers and other smaller warships in preparation for the coming conflict. No A-150 would ever be laid down, and many details of the class' design were destroyed near the end of the war.

Background and design

In the 1930s, the Japanese government began a shift towards an ultranationalist militancy. Planners envisioned an empire stretching from Japan to the resource-rich European colonies in Southeast Asia, and defensible islands in the Pacific Ocean (the Greater East Asia Co-Prosperity Sphere). The extensive distances involved, and the likelihood of this expansion leading to a confrontation with the United States, led the Japanese to build and maintain a large fleet that could seize and hold onto these territories. The U.S. posed a particular problem for Japan, as it possessed significantly greater industrial power, and several leading members of the United States Congress had pledged "to outbuild Japan three to one in a naval race".

The Imperial Japanese Navy had recognized since at least 1896 that the country could not outproduce its potential opponents, and therefore insisted that its ships had to be more powerful than foreign equivalents. It established this qualitative lead at various times over the next 40 years, with the s just before World War I, the s at the end of that war, and the s in the 1930s. The A-150s were designed according to that doctrine to continue their qualitative superiority in battleships over their most likely opponents, the United States and Great Britain.

Early conceptions for what would become the A-150 battleships called for eight or nine 51-centimeter guns in double or triple turrets, as the successful construction of a  gun in 1920–1921 made the Japanese confident that such a large weapon could be built.

Formal design studies began in 1938–1939. They initially focused on a ship closer to the displacement of the preceding , on which plans had just been completed, albeit one mounting six 51-centimeter guns. As the Japanese expected that the Americans would ascertain the true characteristics of the Yamato class—especially its primary armament of  guns, which would become the largest naval weapons in use in the world—they hoped that the 51-centimeter guns would outperform any American response to the Yamatos smaller guns.

Specifications 
Plans for the A-150s were finished in early 1941, for most intents and purposes. However, these were destroyed at the end of the war, along with most of the other documentation relating to the class. The general destruction of records and Japan's extensive efforts (before and during the war) to keep any information about the ships out of the hands of foreign nations severely limited the amount of information on the ships available to historians. For these reasons the A-150's exact specifications are uncertain. This was so large that steel mills in Japan were incapable of manufacturing it. Instead, two layers of armor plates would have been used, despite its reduced effectiveness as compared to a single plate of the same total thickness.

Armament
The design of the A-150s called for a main battery of six 45-caliber 51-centimeter guns in three twin turrets. These would have been the largest ever fitted to a capital ship, dwarfing the 46-centimeter guns mounted on the Yamato class, and were a key factor in naval historians William H. Garzke and Robert O. Dulin's argument that the A-150s would have been the "most powerful battleships in history". Construction of two of the 51-centimeter guns was ordered in 1941 for trials at the Kure Naval Arsenal and detailed designs of their turrets were drawn up.

The composition of the A-150's secondary armament is not fully known. Historians Eric Lacroix and Linton Wells have written that Japanese designers were considering mounting a large number of 65-caliber  Type 98 dual-purpose guns, though this was not final. They were able to fire 15–19 rounds per minute.

Construction
As war with the United States became increasingly likely over the Second Sino-Japanese War, and particularly after the Japanese seizure of French Indochina in mid-1940, all design work on battleships was diverted in early 1941—even though the A-150's design was nearly complete—in order to focus on higher-priority warships like aircraft carriers and cruisers. Two A-150s, provisionally designated as Warships Number 798 and 799, were projected in a 1942 building program. The ships would have then have been finished in 1946–1947, but the war's turn against the Japanese after the Battle of Midway meant that the need for ships other than battleships never abated.

Notes

References

Bibliography

 
 
 
 
 
 
 
 
 
 

Battleship classes
Battleships of the Imperial Japanese Navy
Proposed ships
Cancelled ships